Pierre Bouillon (1776–1831) was a French painter and engraver.  Born at Thiviers, he studied with the Académie-trained history painter Nicolas-André Monsiau.  He was awarded the grand prize of the Institut de France in July 1797 for his painting The Death of Cato of Utica. He exhibited in the Salon in 1796, 1799, 1801, 1804, 1819, 1822, and 1824.

As drawing instructor at the Lycée Louis Le Grand in Paris, he was a teacher of Théodore Géricault and perhaps also Eugène Delacroix.  He was employed extensively to make preparatory drawings for the engravings of Pierre Laurent's publication, Le Musée français; his drawing for Charles Clément Bervic's celebrated engraving of the sculpture of Laocoön is among the 27 examples attributed to him in this work.  Pierre Bouillon was also responsible for a publication devoted exclusively to the classical sculpture of the Louvre Museum, consisting of plates which he drew and etched himself, Le Musée des antiques ..., issued in 3 large folio volumes, 1811–1827.

Gallery

References

1776 births
1831 deaths
People from Dordogne
18th-century French painters
French male painters
19th-century French painters
French neoclassical painters
19th-century French male artists
18th-century French male artists